Pilgrimstad is a locality situated in Bräcke Municipality, Jämtland County, Sweden with 386 inhabitants in 2010.

It is mostly known for the small micro-brewery, Jämtlands Bryggeri that is located in the village.

Historically, Pilgrimstad has an old history. The village is named after a water well where pilgrims stopped on their pilgrimage travels to Trondheim, Norway. Yet to this day, the inhabitants of the village get their water from this well.

References

External links 
Pilgrimstad - Official site
Bräcke

Populated places in Bräcke Municipality
Jämtland
Former Norwegian populated places